The term Cologne School of Painting was first applied in the 19th century to describe old German paintings generally. It subsequently came to refer more specifically to painters who had their workshops in medieval Cologne and the lower-Rhine region from about 1300 to 1550.

Style periods 

Initially smaller altarpieces such as the Klaren Altar in the Cologne Cathedral from  about 1360–70 were created, based on book paintings from around the year 1300. The mid-15th century is the high-point of this school, when Stefan Lochner (active 1442–1451) created the Altar of the City Patrons, which is considered to be the greatest masterpiece of the Cologne School. A third creative period followed, under the influence of Netherlandish painters such as Rogier van der Weyden.  Rogier's influence is especially notable in the work of the outstanding representative of this final phase, the anonymous painter known as the Master of the Saint Bartholomew Altarpiece. For example, the latter's large Deposition of Christ resembles the same theme represented in the former's Escorial altarpiece, and the Master's heightened naturalism and emphasis on tear-stained features reflect Rogier's emotionalism.

Painters of the Cologne School 
 
The artists of the Cologne School include Stefan Lochner and William of Cologne, as well as a number of artists identified only by the works they created:

Master of the Saint Bartholomew Altarpiece

Master of the Life of the Virgin

Master of the Wasservass Calvary

Master of the Sinzig Calvary

The Cologne artists' quarter 
The Cologne painters worked mainly in the area of Old Cologne around the Schildergasse, the artists' quarter, where sign painters were also active.

References
 

Footnotes

Further reading
 
 
 
 
 
 
 
 
 

German art movements
German painters
Medieval German painters
German artist groups and collectives
Culture in Cologne
History of Cologne